Saydy (Saydıı) is a rural locality (a selo), and one of two settlements in Ynginsky Rural Okrug of Tomponsky District in the Sakha Republic, Russia, in addition to Novy, the administrative center of the Rural Okrug. Its population as of the 2002 Census was 177.

References

Notes

Sources
Official website of the Sakha Republic. Registry of the Administrative-Territorial Divisions of the Sakha Republic. Tomponsky District. 

Rural localities in Tomponsky District